Virilità (Virility) is a 1974 Italian film comedy directed by Paolo Cavara.

The film got a great commercial success, grossing 1 billion and 261 millions lire at the Italian box office.

Cast 
Turi Ferro: Vito La Casella
Agostina Belli: Cettina
Marc Porel: Roberto La Casella
Tuccio Musumeci: Lawyer Fisichella
Anna Bonaiuto: Lucia
Geraldine Hooper: Pat
Attilio Dottesio: Dream Judge

References

External links

1974 films
Films directed by Paolo Cavara
Films set in Sicily
Italian comedy films
1974 comedy films
1970s Italian films